TMEM106C is a gene that encodes the transmembrane protein 106C (TMEM106C) in Homo sapiens It has been found to be overexpressed in cancer cells and also is related to distal arthrogryposis, a condition of stiff joints and irregular muscle development. The TMEM106C gene contains a domain of unknown function, DUF1356, that spans most of the protein. Transmembrane protein 106C also goes by the aliases MGC5576 or MGC111210, LOC79022.

Location and gene neighborhood 

The TMEM106C gene is located on the long arm of the 12th chromosome. It is found at position 12q13.1. This gene spans from 48357225 to 48362667  on chromosome 12. This gene is in between COL2A1, the human type II collagen gene, and VDR, the human Vitamin D Receptor gene.

This protein is found to be an integral part of the endoplasm reticulum membrane.

Protein structure 

 The TMEM106A protein has a molecular weight of 27.9 kdal with a PI of 6.325. It has 250 amino acids, 230 of which are in the domain of unknown function.  No signal peptide has been found for this protein but TMEM106C has transmembrane regions which gives evidence for an internal signal peptide.  This protein spans the ER membrane 2 times. There is evidence that these transmembrane regions take on helical structures. The predicted structure of the protein is shown to the left: 
TMEM106C is valine-rich with no tryptophan.

There are several areas for post-translational modification for TMEM106A including:
 Phosphorylation
 Kinase-Specific Phosphoylation
 N-glycosylation

Expression 

This gene is highly expressed. TMEM106C is expressed 4.9 times the average gene.   TMEM106C has ubiquitous expression. It can be found expressed in many tissues types. Tissue types with high expression included the adrenal gland, eye, reproductive organs, cervix and blood. High expression was found using EST and GEO data.

This gene is also found overexpressed in cancer cells. This gene has found to be expressed three times more in adrenal tumor and twice more in bladder carcinoma and retinoblastoma than normal expression.  It is also found to be highly expressed in breast (mammary gland) tumor, cervical tumor, esophageal tumor, leukemia, liver tumor; lung tumor, pancreatic tumor, prostate cancer, and soft tissue/muscle tissue tumor.
TMEM106C is found in all stages of development from embryoid body, blastocyst, fetus, infant, juvenile and adult.

Homology

Paralogs 

There are two paralogs for TMEM106C. These paralogs are TMEM106A and TMEM106B. Both genes are found highly conserved in Mammalia. TMEM106A is also found to be conserved in invertebrates as well. The protein was found in tapeworms and other invertebrate worms.

Orthologs 

TMEM106C is highly conserved in Mammalia. Links to sequences can be found in the table below:

References